Mount Cabeza is a mountain in Stavertsi Ridge on the southeast side of Pare Glacier,  southwest of Hales Peak, in the northeast portion of Brabant Island, Palmer Archipelago in Antarctica. The name "Monte Cabeza" was used on a 1957 Argentine hydrographic chart.

Maps 
 Antarctic Digital Database (ADD). Scale 1:250000 topographic map of Antarctica. Scientific Committee on Antarctic Research (SCAR). Since 1993, regularly upgraded and updated.
 British Antarctic Territory. Scale 1:200000 topographic map. DOS 610 Series, Sheet W 64 62. Directorate of Overseas Surveys, Tolworth, UK, 1980.
 Brabant Island to Argentine Islands. Scale 1:250000 topographic map. British Antarctic Survey, 2008.

External links 
 Mount Cabeza. Adjusted Copernix satellite image

References 

Mountains of the Palmer Archipelago